Peter Fitzgerald (born 1951) is an Australian former rugby league footballer who played in the 1960s and 1970s.

Career

Remembered as a ferocious tackler and originally from Canowindra, New South Wales, Peter Fitzgerald came to St George Dragons as an 18-year-old in 1969 on the recommendation of Ian Walsh. He gave great service to St George Dragons in the seven seasons that he played for them between 1969–1975, which included his appearance in two (losing) Grand Finals of 1971 and 1975, and many semi final appearances.

After the Grand Final defeat in 1975, Peter Fitzgerald moved to Sydney Roosters for one year in 1976 and re-united with his former coach Jack Gibson. Fitzgerald finished  his career at Port Kembla where he captained the team to win the 1980 Wollongong premiership under the coaching of his old friend and ex team-mate, Graeme Langlands.

Peter Fitzgerald has been in the real-estate business in Wollongong for many years and still resides there.

References

1951 births
Living people
St. George Dragons players
Sydney Roosters players
Australian rugby league players
Rugby league second-rows
Date of birth missing (living people)
Rugby league players from New South Wales